Third Lake is a small lake southwest of Bisby Lodge in Herkimer County, New York. It drains west via an unnamed creek which flows into Sand Lake.

See also
 List of lakes in New York

References 

Lakes of New York (state)
Lakes of Herkimer County, New York